Korematsu v. United States, 323 U.S. 214 (1944), was a landmark decision by the Supreme Court of the United States to uphold the exclusion of Japanese Americans from the West Coast Military Area during World War II. The decision has been widely criticized, with some scholars describing it as "an odious and discredited artifact of popular bigotry", and as "a stain on American jurisprudence". The case is often cited as one of the worst Supreme Court decisions of all time. Chief Justice John Roberts repudiated the Korematsu decision in his majority opinion in the 2018 case of Trump v. Hawaii.

In the aftermath of Imperial Japan's attack on Pearl Harbor, President Franklin D. Roosevelt had issued Executive Order 9066 on February 19, 1942, authorizing the U.S. War Department to create military areas from which any or all Americans might be excluded. Subsequently, the Western Defense Command, a U.S. Army military command charged with coordinating the defense of the West Coast of the United States, ordered "all persons of Japanese ancestry, including aliens and non-aliens" to relocate to internment camps. However, a 23-year-old Japanese-American man, Fred Korematsu, refused to leave the exclusion zone and instead challenged the order on the grounds that it violated the Fifth Amendment.

In a majority opinion joined by five other justices, Associate Justice Hugo Black held that the need to protect against espionage by Japan outweighed the rights of Americans of Japanese ancestry. Black wrote that "Korematsu was not excluded from the Military Area because of hostility to him or his race", but rather "because the properly constituted military authorities ... decided that the military urgency of the situation demanded that all citizens of Japanese ancestry be segregated from the West Coast" during the war against Japan. Dissenting justices Frank Murphy, Robert H. Jackson, and Owen J. Roberts all criticized the exclusion as racially discriminatory; Murphy wrote that the exclusion of Japanese "falls into the ugly abyss of racism" and resembled "the abhorrent and despicable treatment of minority groups by the dictatorial tyrannies which this nation is now pledged to destroy."

The Korematsu opinion was the first instance in which the Supreme Court applied the strict scrutiny standard of review to racial discrimination by the government; it is one of only a handful of cases in which the Court held that the government met that standard. Korematsu's conviction was voided by a California district court in 1983 on the grounds that Solicitor General Charles H. Fahy had suppressed a report from the Office of Naval Intelligence that held that there was no evidence that Japanese Americans were acting as spies for Japan. The Japanese-Americans who were interned were later granted reparations through the Civil Liberties Act of 1988.

Background

In the wake of the Japanese attack on Pearl Harbor and the report of the First Roberts Commission, President Franklin D. Roosevelt issued Executive Order 9066 on February 19, 1942, authorizing the War Department to create military areas from which any or all Americans might be excluded, and to provide for the necessary transport, lodging, and feeding of persons displaced from such areas. On March 2, 1942, the U.S. Army Lieutenant General John L. DeWitt, commander of the Western Defense Command, issued Public Proclamation No. 1, demarcating western military areas and the exclusion zones therein, and directing any "Japanese, German, or Italian aliens" and any person of Japanese ancestry to inform the U.S. Postal Service of any changes of residence. Further military areas and zones were demarcated in Public Proclamation No. 2.

In the meantime, Secretary of War Henry L. Stimson mailed to Senator Robert Rice Reynolds and House Speaker Sam Rayburn draft legislation authorizing the enforcement of Executive Order 9066. By March 21, Congress had enacted the proposed legislation, which Roosevelt signed into law. On March 24, 1942, Western Defense Command began issuing Civilian Exclusion orders, commanding that "all persons of Japanese ancestry, including aliens and non-aliens" report to designated assembly points. With the issuance of Civilian Restrictive Order No. 1 on May 19, 1942, Japanese Americans were forced to move into relocation camps.

Meanwhile, Fred Korematsu was a 23-year-old Japanese-American man who decided to stay at his residence in San Leandro, California, instead of obeying the order to relocate; however, he knowingly violated Civilian Exclusion Order No. 34 of the U.S. Army, even undergoing plastic surgery in an attempt to conceal his identity. Korematsu argued that Executive Order 9066 was unconstitutional and that it violated the Fifth Amendment to the United States Constitution. The Fifth Amendment was selected over the Fourteenth Amendment due to the lack of federal protections in the Fourteenth Amendment. He was arrested and convicted. No question was raised as to Korematsu's loyalty to the United States. The Court of Appeals for the Ninth Circuit eventually affirmed his conviction, and the Supreme Court granted certiorari.

Decision

Black's majority opinion

The decision of the case, written by Justice Hugo Black, found the case largely indistinguishable from the previous year's Hirabayashi v. United States decision, and rested largely on the same principle: deference to Congress and the military authorities, particularly in light of the uncertainty following Pearl Harbor.  Justice Black further denied that the case had anything to do with racial prejudice: Korematsu was not excluded from the Military Area because of hostility to him or his race. He was excluded because we are at war with the Japanese Empire, because the properly constituted military authorities feared an invasion of our West Coast and felt constrained to take proper security measures, because they decided that the military urgency of the situation demanded that all citizens of Japanese ancestry be segregated from the West Coast temporarily, and, finally, because Congress, reposing its confidence in this time of war in our military leaders—as inevitably it must—determined that they should have the power to do just this.

In his diaries, Justice Felix Frankfurter reported that Justice Black told the justices as reason for deferring to the executive branch: "Somebody must run this war. It is either Roosevelt or us. And we cannot."

While Korematsu is regularly described as upholding the internment of Japanese Americans, the majority opinion expressly declined to reach the issue of internment on the ground that Korematsu's conviction did not present that issue, which it said raised different questions.  The Court cross-referenced its decision the same day in Ex Parte Endo, 323 U.S. 283 (1944), in which the Court ruled that a loyal Japanese American must be released from detention.

Frankfurter's concurrence

Justice Frankfurter's concurrence reads in its entirety:
According to my reading of Civilian Exclusion Order No. 34, it was an offense for Korematsu to be found in Military Area No. 1, the territory wherein he was previously living, except within the bounds of the established Assembly Center of that area. Even though the various orders issued by General DeWitt be deemed a comprehensive code of instructions, their tenor is clear, and not contradictory. They put upon Korematsu the obligation to leave Military Area No. 1, but only by the method prescribed in the instructions, i.e., by reporting to the Assembly Center. I am unable to see how the legal considerations that led to the decision in Hirabayashi v. United States, 320 U.S. 81, fail to sustain the military order which made the conduct now in controversy a crime. And so I join in the opinion of the Court, but should like to add a few words of my own.
The provisions of the Constitution which confer on the Congress and the President powers to enable this country to wage war are as much part of the Constitution as provisions looking to a nation at peace. And we have had recent occasion to quote approvingly the statement of former Chief Justice Hughes that the war power of the Government is "the power to wage war successfully". Hirabayashi v. United States, supra, at 93, and see Home Bldg. & L. Assn. v. Blaisdell, 290 U.S. 398, 426. Therefore, the validity of action under the war power must be judged wholly in the context of war. That action is not to be stigmatized as lawless because like action in times of peace would be lawless. To talk about a military order that expresses an allowable judgment of war needs by those entrusted with the duty of conducting war as "an [p. 225] unconstitutional order" is to suffuse a part of the Constitution with an atmosphere of unconstitutionality. The respective spheres of action of military authorities and of judges are, of course, very different. But, within their sphere, military authorities are no more outside the bounds of obedience to the Constitution than are judges within theirs. "The war power of the United States, like its other powers... is subject to applicable constitutional limitations", Hamilton v. Kentucky Distilleries Co., 251 U.S. 146, 156. To recognize that military orders are "reasonably expedient military precautions" in time of war, and yet to deny them constitutional legitimacy, makes of the Constitution an instrument for dialectic subtleties not reasonably to be attributed to the hard-headed Framers, of whom a majority had had actual participation in war. If a military order such as that under review does not transcend the means appropriate for conducting war, such action by the military is as constitutional as would be any authorized action by the Interstate Commerce Commission within the limits of the constitutional power to regulate commerce. And, being an exercise of the war power explicitly granted by the Constitution for safeguarding the national life by prosecuting war effectively, I find nothing in the Constitution which denies to Congress the power to enforce such a valid military order by making its violation an offense triable in the civil courts. Compare Interstate Commerce Commission v. Brimson, 154 U.S. 447; 155 U.S. 3, and Monongahela Bridge Co. v. United States, 216 U.S. 177. To find that the Constitution does not forbid the military measures now complained of does not carry with it approval of that which Congress and the Executive did. That is their business, not ours.

Murphy's dissent

Justice Frank Murphy issued a vehement dissent, saying that the exclusion of Japanese "falls into the ugly abyss of racism", and resembles "the abhorrent and despicable treatment of minority groups by the dictatorial tyrannies which this nation is now pledged to destroy." Murphy argued that collective punishment for Japanese Americans was an unconstitutional response to any disloyalty that might have been found in a minority of their cohort.  He also compared the treatment of Japanese Americans with the treatment of Americans of German and Italian ancestry, as evidence that race, and not emergency alone, led to the exclusion order which Korematsu was convicted of violating: I dissent, therefore, from this legalization of racism. Racial discrimination in any form and in any degree has no justifiable part whatever in our democratic way of life. It is unattractive in any setting, but it is utterly revolting among a free people who have embraced the principles set forth in the Constitution of the United States. All residents of this nation are kin in some way by blood or culture to a foreign land. Yet they are primarily and necessarily a part of the new and distinct civilization of the United States. They must, accordingly, be treated at all times as the heirs of the American experiment, and as entitled to all the rights and freedoms guaranteed by the Constitution.

Justice Murphy's two uses of the term "racism" in this opinion, along with two additional uses in his concurrence in Steele v. Louisville & Nashville Railway Co., decided the same day, are among the first appearances of the word "racism" in a United States Supreme Court opinion.

Justice Murphy's dissent is considered the strongest of the three dissenting opinions and, since the 1980s, has been cited as part of modern jurisprudence's categorical rejection of the majority opinion.

Roberts's dissent

Justice Roberts's dissent also acknowledges the racism inherent in the case although he does not use the word. He recognized that the defendant was being punished based solely upon his ancestry: This is not a case of keeping people off the streets at night, as was Hirabayashi v. United States, 320 U.S. 81, [p. 226] nor a case of temporary exclusion of a citizen from an area for his own safety or that of the community, nor a case of offering him an opportunity to go temporarily out of an area where his presence might cause danger to himself or to his fellows. On the contrary, it is the case of convicting a citizen as a punishment for not submitting to imprisonment in a concentration camp, based on his ancestry, and solely because of his ancestry, without evidence or inquiry concerning his loyalty and good disposition towards the United States. If this be a correct statement of the facts disclosed by this record, and facts of which we take judicial notice, I need hardly labor the conclusion that Constitutional rights have been violated.

Jackson's dissent

By contrast, Justice Robert Jackson's dissent argued that "defense measures will not, and often should not, be held within the limits that bind civil authority in peace", and that it would perhaps be unreasonable to hold the military, who issued the exclusion order, to the same standards of constitutionality that apply to the rest of the government. "In the very nature of things", he wrote, "military decisions are not susceptible of intelligent judicial appraisal." He acknowledged the Court's powerlessness in that regard, writing that "courts can never have any real alternative to accepting the mere declaration of the authority that issued the order that it was reasonably necessary from a military viewpoint."

He nonetheless dissented, writing that, even if the courts should not be put in the position of second-guessing or interfering with the orders of military commanders, that does not mean that they should have to ratify or enforce those orders if they are unconstitutional. Jackson writes, "I do not think [the civil courts] may be asked to execute a military expedient that has no place in law under the Constitution. I would reverse the judgment and discharge the prisoner." Indeed, he warns that the precedent of Korematsu might last well beyond the war and the internment: A military order, however unconstitutional, is not apt to last longer than the military emergency. Even during that period, a succeeding commander may revoke it all. But once a judicial opinion rationalizes such an order to show that it conforms to the Constitution, or rather rationalizes the Constitution to show that the Constitution sanctions such an order, the Court for all time has validated the principle of racial discrimination in criminal procedure and of transplanting American citizens. The principle then lies about like a loaded weapon, ready for the hand of any authority that can bring forward a plausible claim of an urgent need. Every repetition imbeds that principle more deeply in our law and thinking and expands it to new purposes.

Jackson further warned: Of course the existence of a military power resting on force, so vagrant, so centralized, so necessarily heedless of the individual, is an inherent threat to liberty. But I would not lead people to rely on this Court for a review that seems to me wholly delusive. The military reasonableness of these orders can only be determined by military superiors. If the people ever let command of the war power fall into irresponsible and unscrupulous hands, the courts wield no power equal to its restraint. The chief restraint upon those who command the physical forces of the country, in the future as in the past, must be their responsibility to the political judgments of their contemporaries and to the moral judgments of history.

Jackson acknowledged the racial issues at hand, writing: Korematsu was born on our soil, of parents born in Japan. The Constitution makes him a citizen of the United States by nativity and a citizen of California by residence. No claim is made that he is not loyal to this country. There is no suggestion that apart from the matter involved here he is not law abiding and well disposed. Korematsu, however, has been convicted of an act not commonly a crime. It consists merely of being present in the state whereof he is a citizen, near the place where he was born, and where all his life he has lived. [...] [H]is crime would result, not from anything he did, said, or thought, different than they, but only in that he was born of different racial stock. Now, if any fundamental assumption underlies our system, it is that guilt is personal and not inheritable. Even if all of one's antecedents had been convicted of treason, the Constitution forbids its penalties to be visited upon him. But here is an attempt to make an otherwise innocent act a crime merely because this prisoner is the son of parents as to whom he had no choice, and belongs to a race from which there is no way to resign. If Congress in peace-time legislation should enact such a criminal law, I should suppose this Court would refuse to enforce it.

Subsequent history

Congressional Commission on Wartime Relocation and Internment of Civilians
In 1980, Congress established a commission to evaluate the events leading up to the issuance of Executive Order 9066 and accompanying military directives and their impact on citizens and resident aliens, charging the commission with recommending remedies.  Discussing the Korematsu decision in their 1982 report entitled Personal Justice Denied, this Congressional Commission on Wartime Relocation and Internment of Civilians (CCWRIC) concluded that "each part of the decision, questions of both factual review and legal principles, has been discredited or abandoned," and that, "Today the decision in Korematsu lies overruled in the court of history."

Conviction overturned

Korematsu challenged his conviction in 1983 by filing before the United States District Court for the Northern District of California a writ of coram nobis, which asserted that the original conviction was so flawed as to represent a grave injustice that should be reversed.  As evidence, he submitted the conclusions of the CCWRIC report as well as newly discovered internal Justice Department communications demonstrating that evidence contradicting the military necessity for the Executive Order 9066 had been knowingly withheld from the Supreme Court.  Specifically, he said Solicitor General Charles H. Fahy had kept from the Court a wartime finding by the Office of Naval Intelligence, the Ringle Report, that concluded very few Japanese represented a risk and that almost all of those who did were already in custody when the Executive Order was enacted. While not admitting error, the government submitted a counter-motion asking the court to vacate the conviction without a finding of fact on its merits.  Judge Marilyn Hall Patel denied the government's petition, and concluded that the Supreme Court had indeed been given a selective record, representing a compelling circumstance sufficient to overturn the original conviction.  She granted the writ, thereby voiding Korematsu's conviction, while pointing out that since this decision was based on prosecutorial misconduct and not an error of law, any legal precedent established by the case remained in force.

2011 DOJ admission of error
On May 20, 2011, Acting Solicitor General Neal Katyal released an unusual statement denouncing one of his predecessors, Solicitor General Charles H. Fahy. He faulted Fahy for having "suppressed critical evidence" in the Hirabayashi and Korematsu cases before the Supreme Court during World War II, specifically the Ringle Report's conclusion that there was no indication Japanese Americans were acting as spies or sending signals to enemy submarines. The rulings in the 1980s that overturned the convictions of Korematsu and Hirabayashi concluded that failure to disclose the Ringle Report, along with an initial report by General De Witt that demonstrated racist motivations behind the military orders, represented a fatal flaw in the prosecution of their cases before the Supreme Court.  Katyal noted that Justice Department attorneys had actually alerted Fahy that failing to disclose the Ringle Report's existence in the briefs or argument in the Supreme Court "might approximate the suppression of evidence". Thus, Katyal concluded that Fahy "did not inform the Court that a key set of allegations used to justify the internment" had been doubted, if not fully discredited, within the government's own agencies.

Katyal therefore announced his office's filing of a formal "admission of error". He reaffirmed the extraordinary duty of the Solicitor General to address the Court with "absolute candor," due to the "special credence" the Court explicitly grants to his court submissions.

21st century reactions

Eleven lawyers who had represented Fred Korematsu, Gordon Hirabayashi, and Minoru Yasui in successful efforts in lower federal courts to nullify their convictions for violating military curfew and exclusion orders sent a letter dated January 13, 2014, to Solicitor General Donald Verrilli Jr. In light of the appeal proceedings before the U.S. Supreme Court in Hedges v. Obama, the lawyers asked Verrilli to ask the Supreme Court to overrule its decisions in Korematsu, Hirabayashi (1943) and Yasui (1943). If the Solicitor General shouldn't do this, they asked that the United States government to "make clear" that the federal government "does not consider the internment decisions as valid precedent for governmental or military detention of individuals or groups without due process of law [...]."

On February 3, 2014, Justice Antonin Scalia, during a discussion with law students at the University of Hawaii at Manoa William S. Richardson School of Law, said that "the Supreme Court's Korematsu decision upholding the internment of Japanese Americans was wrong, but it could happen again in war time." In October 2015 at Santa Clara University, Scalia told law students that Justice Jackson's dissenting opinion in Korematsu was the past court opinion he admired most, adding "It was nice to know that at least somebody on the court realized that that was wrong."

Donald Trump's Presidential election led Kansas Secretary of State Kris Kobach to advocate for Trump to implement immigration controls like the National Security Entry-Exit Registration System. One Trump supporter, Carl Higbie, said that Jimmy Carter's 1980 restriction on Iranian immigration, as well as the Korematsu decision, gives legal precedent for a registry of immigrants. Critics of Higbie argued that Korematsu should not be referenced as precedent. Constitutional lawyer Bruce Fein argued that the Civil Liberties Act of 1988 granting reparations to the Japanese Americans who were interned amounts to Korematsu having been overturned by history—outside of a potential formal Supreme Court overrule. Another critic of Higbie described Korematsu as a "stain on American jurisprudence".

According to Harvard University's Felix Frankfurter Professor of Law Noah Feldman, "a decision can be wrong at the very moment it was decided—and therefore should not be followed subsequently." Justice Anthony Kennedy applied this approach in Lawrence v. Texas to overturn Bowers v. Hardwick and thereby strike down anti-sodomy laws in 14 states.  The implication is that decisions which are wrong when decided should not be followed even before the Court reverses itself, and Korematsu has probably the greatest claim to being wrong when decided of any case which still stood. Legal scholar Richard Primus applied the term "Anti-Canon" to cases which are "universally assailed as wrong, immoral, and unconstitutional" and have become exemplars of faulty legal reasoning.  Plessy v. Ferguson is one such example, and Korematsu has joined this group—as Feldman then put it, "Korematsu's uniquely bad legal status means it's not precedent even though it hasn't been overturned."

Rejection in Trump v. Hawaii 

Chief Justice Roberts, in writing the majority opinion of the Supreme Court in Trump v. Hawaii, stated that Korematsu v. United States was wrongly decided, essentially disavowing the decision and indicating that a majority of the court no longer finds Korematsu persuasive. Quoting Justice Robert H. Jackson's dissent from Korematsu, the Chief Justice stated:

Roberts also added: "The forcible relocation of U.S. citizens to concentration camps, solely and explicitly on the basis of race, is objectively unlawful and outside the scope of Presidential authority." Congress regards Korematsu as having been overruled by Trump v. Hawaii.

Rejection in dissent of United States v. Zubaydah 
Justice Gorsuch, writing in his dissent of United States v. Zubaydah, reiterated the fact that Korematsu was negligent. Gorsuch criticised the court for allowing "state interest" as a justification for "suppressing judicial proceedings in the name of national security." He used Korematsu as a justification against doing such.

Justice Gorsuch dissented stating:

See also
 Anticanon
 Commission on Wartime Relocation and Internment of Civilians
 Ex parte Endo
 Hirabayashi v. United States
 Fred Korematsu Day
 Fred T. Korematsu Institute for Civil Rights and Education
 Japanese American redress and court cases
 Mochizuki v. United States
 Trail of tears
 Yasui v. United States

References

Further reading

External links
 
 
 
 Of Civil Wrongs and Rights, official site (2001 P.O.V. documentary on the 1983 coram nobis case)
 A documentary on Korematsu v. United States
 "Supreme Court Landmark Case Korematsu v. United States" from C-SPAN's Landmark Cases: Historic Supreme Court Decisions
 "Civil Liberties in Times of Crisis: Japanese American Internment and America Today" with Karen Korematsu and Kermit Roosevelt, from the National Constitution Center.
  Japanese Relocation (1943 FILM- viewable for free at not-for profit- The Internet Archive)

1944 in United States case law
20th-century American trials
Internment of Japanese Americans
United States equal protection case law
American Civil Liberties Union litigation
History of San Leandro, California
1944 in California
United States Supreme Court cases of the Stone Court
Overruled United States Supreme Court decisions
Race and law in the United States
United States racial discrimination case law
United States Supreme Court cases